In organometallic chemistry, a transition metal formyl complex is a metal complex containing one (usually) or more formyl (CHO) ligand.  A subset of transition metal acyl complexes, formyl complexes can be viewed as metalla-aldehydes. A representative example is (CO)5ReCHO.  The formyl is viewed as an X (pseudohalide) ligand. Metal formyls are proposed as intermediates in the hydrogenation of carbon monoxide, as occurs in the Fischer-Tropsch process.

Structure and bonding
The MCHO group is planar.  A C=O double bond is indicated by X-ray crystallography.  A second resonance structure has a M=C double bond, with negative charge on oxygen.

Synthesis and reactions
Metal formyl complexes are often prepared by the reaction of metal carbonyls with hydride reagents:
[Re(CO)6]+  +  H−   →   (CO)5ReCHO
The CO ligand is the electrophile and the hydride (provided typically from a borohydride) is the nucleophile.

Some metal formyls are produced by reaction of metal carbonyl anions with reagents that donate the equivalent of a formyl cation, such a mixed formate anhydrides.

Metal formyls participate in many reactions, many of which are motivated by interest in Fischer-Tropsch chemistry.  O-alkylation gives carbenoid complexes.  The formyl ligand also functions as a base, allowing the formation of M-CH=O-M' linkages. Decarbonylation leads to de-insertion of the carbonyl, yielding hydride complexes.

References

Organometallic chemistry
Transition metals
Coordination chemistry